Defensive driving describes the practice of anticipating dangerous situations, despite adverse conditions or the mistakes of others when operating a motor vehicle. It can be achieved by adhering to general guidelines, such as keeping a two- or three-second gap between the driver's vehicle and the vehicle in front to ensure adequate space to stop. It is a form of training for drivers that goes beyond road rules and the basic mechanics of driving techniques. Defensive driving reduces the risk of collisions and improves road safety.

History 

A driver safety program called the Driver Example Program was developed in 1964 by Chris Imhoff of the (US) National Safety Council. The program instituted a Defensive Driving Course (DDC). Defensive Driving Courses, along with Instructor Development Courses were offered beginning 1964 and 1965, typically through corporate sponsorships.

General principles 

Driving defensively includes:

 General principles: 
 Controlling your speed.
 Looking ahead and being prepared for unexpected events.
 Being alert and distraction free.
 Regarding other participants in traffic:
 Preparedness for all sorts of actions and reactions of other drivers and pedestrians.
 Not expecting the other drivers to do what you would ordinarily do.
 Watching and respecting other drivers.
 Regarding your own vehicle:
 Maintaining a safe following distance.
 Driving safely considering (adjusting for) weather and/or road conditions.
 Adjusting your speed before entering a bend, in order to avoid applying the brakes in the middle of a bend.

Training and courses 

Several US government agencies, nonprofit organizations, and private schools have launched specialty courses that improve the public's driving skills. In the United States a few of the familiar courses in defensive driving include Alive at 25, DDC or Defensive Driving Course, Coaching the Mature Driver, Attitudinal Dynamics of Driving, Insurance discount, Seat Belt Safety, Handsfree, Professional Truck Driving, and DDC for Instructors. In relation to this, the government has launched active airbag and seat belt safety campaigns that encourage high visibility enforcement.

In addition to improving one's own driving skills, many US states provide an incentive to complete an approved defensive driving course by offering mandated insurance discounts or a way to mask a traffic ticket from one's driving record. In some instances, these courses are referred to as traffic school or a defensive driving school.  States with the biggest incentives include Arizona, California, Florida, Nevada, New Jersey, New York, and Texas. A number of private providers offer a variety of courses. The methods and styles of the courses vary; but they are typically less comprehensive than training to pass an advanced driving test through the Institute of Advanced Motorists, Royal Society for the Prevention of Accidents Advanced Drivers and Riders, or British Motorcyclists Federation Blue Riband.

While US training has typically focused on handling skills – such as the Bondurant school of high-performance driving – British training has emphasized roadcraft. Defensive and advanced driving and motorcycling are commonly recognized in the UK, championed by charities such as the Institute of Advanced Motorists and the Royal Society for the Prevention of Accidents' Advanced Drivers and Riders.

Benefits of roadcraft
British research has shown advanced drivers who use the roadcraft system of car control are safer and have better fuel efficiency too.  The roadcraft system was devised in 1937 by racing driver Mark Everard Pepys, 6th Earl of Cottenham, to reduce accidents in police pursuits. A study by Brunel University found advanced drivers who had successfully completed the Institute of Advanced Motorists training were nearly 70% better in all aspects of their driving – from steering to judging distances and speed. Earlier research by Britain's Transport Research Laboratory that concluded drivers are less likely to crash if they have reached a measurable higher driving standard. Unpublished research by IAM Surety (an insurance company) showed that insurance claims by members of the Institute of Advanced Motorists were far cheaper than comparable non-members. Additionally – according to the Association of Motor Insurers – there is a reduction in claims for the first four years after passing the Institute of Advanced Motorists test.

See also
Advanced driving test
Assured Clear Distance Ahead
Automobile safety
British Motorcyclists Federation
Impact Teen Drivers
Institute of Advanced Motorists
National Safety Council
National Teen Driver Safety Week
Roadcraft
Road-traffic safety
Royal Society for the Prevention of Accidents
Situation awareness

Notes

References

External links 
 World Health Organization Report on road traffic injury prevention

Driving techniques
Risk management